Jeff Witte (born December 26, 1965) is an American politician serving in the Minnesota House of Representatives since 2023. A member of the Republican Party of Minnesota, Witte represents District 57B in the southern Twin Cities metropolitan area, which includes the city of Lakeville and parts of Dakota County, Minnesota.

Early life, education and career 
Witte received his bachelor's degree in social work and criminal justice from Winona State University, and earner a master's in police leadership, administration and education from the University of St. Thomas. Witte served as an officer in the Burnsville Police Department for 27 years. He also served on the Lakeville Planning Commission from 2017 until he was elected to the legislature.

Minnesota House of Representatives 
Witte was first elected to the Minnesota House of Representatives in 2022, after redistricting created a new Lakeville-based legislative district. Witte serves on the Public Safety Finance and Policy and the Taxes Committees.

Electoral history

Personal life 
Witte lives in Lakeville, Minnesota with his wife Jennifer, and has three children.

References

External links 

Living people
1965 births
21st-century American politicians
Republican Party members of the Minnesota House of Representatives
Winona State University alumni
University of St. Thomas (Minnesota) alumni
People from Lakeville, Minnesota